Eta Cygni (η Cygni) is a star in the northern constellation of Cygnus. It is visible to the naked eye with an apparent visual magnitude of 3.889. The star lies along the main body of the constellation, about midway between Gamma Cygni and Albireo. Based upon an annual parallax shift of 24.17 mas, it is located 135 light years from the Sun.

At an age of about 3.3 billion years, this is an evolved red clump giant star with a stellar classification of K0 III. It is presently on the horizontal branch and is generating energy through the nuclear fusion of helium at its core. The star has about 1.59 times the mass of the Sun and has expanded to 11 It radiates 52.5 times the solar luminosity from its outer atmosphere at an effective temperature of 4,783 K.

Eta Cygni has five visual companions, of which only component B appears to be physically associated. This magnitude 12.0 star lies at an angular separation of 7.80 arc seconds along a position angle of 206°, as of 2007.

References

External links

K-type giants
Horizontal-branch stars
Double stars
Cygnus (constellation)
Cygni, Eta
BD+34 3798
Cygni, 21
188947
098110
7615